is a Japanese ski mountaineer and telemark skier.

Selected results 
 2007:
 5th (and 3rd in the senior's ranking), Asian Championship, Tsugaike Kōgen Ski Resort, Nagano, Japan
 2009:
 4th, Asian Championship, individual
 5th, Asian Championship, vertical race
 2010:
 10th, World Championship, relay, together with Itō Mayumi and Mase Chigaya
 3rd, Gangwon Provincial Governor's Cup, Yongpyong Ski Resort/Balwangsan
 3rd, Tsugaike, individual, Nagano Prefecture
 2011:
 10th, World Championship, relay, together with Catrin Thomas and Mase Chigaya

References

External links 
 Horibe Michiko, skimountaineering.org
 

1974 births
Living people
Japanese female ski mountaineers
Japanese telemark skiers